Bamboo textile is any cloth, yarn or clothing made from bamboo fibres. While historically used only for structural elements, such as bustles and the ribs of corsets, in recent years different technologies have been developed that allow bamboo fibre to be used for a wide range of textile and fashion applications.

Examples include clothing such as shirt tops, pants, socks for adults and children as well as bedding such as sheets and pillow covers. Bamboo yarn can also be blended with other textile fibres such as hemp or spandex. Bamboo is an alternative to plastic that is renewable and can be replenished at a fast rate.

Modern clothing labeled as being made from bamboo is usually viscose rayon, a fiber made by dissolving the cellulose in the bamboo, and then extruding it to form fibres. This process removes the natural characteristics of bamboo fibre, rendering it identical to rayon from other cellulose sources.

Different forms of bamboo-derived fiber 
Bamboo fibres are all cellulose fibre extracted or fabricated from natural bamboo, but they vary widely.

Textiles labelled as being made from bamboo are usually not made by mechanical crushing and retting. They are generally synthetic rayon made from cellulose extracted from bamboo. Bamboo is used whole and in strips; these strips may be considered stiff fibers.

Stiff strips 

Bamboo can be cut into thin strips and used for basketry.

In China and Japan, thin strips of bamboo were woven together into hats and shoes. One particular design of bamboo hats was associated with rural life, worn mostly by farmers and fishermen for protection from the sun.

In the West, bamboo, alongside other components such as whalebone and steel wire, was sometimes used as a structural component in corsets, bustles and other types of structural elements of fashionable women's dresses.

Bamboo rayon 

Rayon is a semi-synthetic fiber made by chemically reshaping cellulose. Cellulose extracted from bamboo is suitable for processing into viscose rayon (rayon is also made from cellulose from other sources).

Bamboo leaves and the soft, inner pith from the hard bamboo trunk are extracted using a steeping process and then mechanically crushed to extract the cellulose. The viscose rayon process then treats the fibers with lye, and adds carbon disulfide to form sodium cellulose xanthate. After time, temperature, and various inorganic and organic additives (including the amount of air contact) determining the final degree of polymerization, the xanthate is acidified to regenerate the cellulose and release dithiocarbonic acid that later decomposes back to carbon disulfide and water.

Viscose manufactured from bamboo is promoted as having environmental advantages over viscose made with cellulose extracted from wood pulp. Bamboo crops may be grown on marginal land unsuitable for forestry; demand for bamboo has sometimes led to clearing forests to plant bamboo. But this is less common since Chinese forestry policy reforms in the 1990s. The viscose processing results in the same chemical waste products as wood-pulp viscose, notably carbon disulfide. But bamboo cellulose is suitable for a closed-loop viscose process that captures all solvents used.

Workers are seriously harmed by inhaling the carbon disulfide (CS2) used to make bamboo viscose. Effects include psychosis, heart attacks, liver damage, and blindness. Rayon factories rarely give information on their occupational exposure limits and compliance. Even in developed countries, safety laws are too lax to prevent harm.

Issues

Occupational safety 
There are health threats from rayon manufacture. Bamboo rayon manufacture, like other rayon manufacture, exposes rayon workers to volatile carbon disulfide. Inhaling it causes serious health problems. Around 75 percent of all polluting emissions from the bamboo viscose process occur as air emissions.

While it is possible to protect workers from the CS2, some legal limits for occupational exposure are still far higher than recommended by medical researchers. Rayon factories vary widely in the amount of CS2 they expose their workers to, and in the information they give about their safety limits or their compliance.

False advertising 
In the U.S., the Federal Trade Commission (FTC) has ruled that unless a yarn is made directly with bamboo fibre — often called "mechanically processed bamboo"—it must be called "rayon" or "rayon made from bamboo". The U.S. Environmental Protection Agency (EPA) noted that the manufacturing process further purifies the cellulose, alters the physical form of the fibre, and modifies the molecular orientation within the fibre and its degree of polymerization. The end product is still cellulose, and is functionally identical to rayon made from cellulose from other plant sources.

Agricultural 
Bamboo can be cultivated quickly, can be used as a cash crop in impoverished regions of the developing world. It is a natural fibre (as opposed to popular synthetics like polyester) whose cultivation results in a decrease in greenhouse gases. There may be environmental problems with the cultivation of land expressly for bamboo plantations.

Anti-bacterial claims 
Even though bamboo fabrics are often advertised as antibacterial, finished bamboo fabric only retains some of bamboo's original antibacterial properties. Some studies have shown rayon-bamboo to possess a certain degree of anti-bacterial properties. Studies in China (2010) and India (2012) have investigated the antibacterial nature of bamboo-rayon fabric against even harsh levels of bacteria such as Staphylococcus aureus and Escherichia coli. While the Indian study found that "bamboo rayon showed excellent and durable antibacterial activities against both gram-positive and gram-negative bacteria", the Chinese study concluded "the bamboo pulp fabric just like cotton fabric has not possessed antimicrobial property".

The FTC has charged companies with false antimicrobial claims when the fibre has been made with rayon. Critics cite the cotton industry's powerful lobbying groups in influencing the FTC decision, and dismissal of the international studies proving otherwise.

Mechanically produced fine bamboo fiber 

Some bamboo fibre is made by a mechanical-bacterial process similar to retting flax into linen fibre. In this way, the woody part of the bamboo is crushed mechanically before an enzyme-retting and washing process is used to break down the walls and extract the fibre. The natural enzyme comes from pre-existing microorganisms on the bamboo. This bast fibre is then spun into yarn. In fine counts the yarn has a silky touch. The same manufacturing process is used to produce linen fabric from flax or hemp. Bamboo fabric made from this process is sometimes called bamboo linen. The natural processing of litrax bamboo allows the fibre to remain strong and produce a high quality product. This process gives a material that is very durable.

Another means of extracting fibre from bamboo, and probably the only purely mechanical process of extraction anywhere in the world, is practiced in the days preceding the annual festival of the Kottiyur Temple of Kerala, India. The article is made out of newly emerging Ochlandra travancorica culms, which go through a process of alternating pounding with stones and retting in water lasting several days, followed by a combing to remove the pith, leaving the cream white fibres and a stub of the bamboo. The fibre is too coarse and the process very cumbersome, to be of much use in making fine yarn, thread or textiles.

Material properties 
Mechanically produced bamboo fiber and bamboo rayon have markedly different properties. They look different under a scanning electron microscope (the mechanically produced fiber has nodes). Bamboo rayon varies in physical properties, as would be expected from the range of properties in other rayon.

Bamboo composite and biopolymer construction 
There are various approaches to the use of bamboo in composites and as an additive in biopolymers for construction. In this case, as opposed to bamboo fabrics for clothing, bamboo fibres are extracted through mechanical needling and scraping or through a steam explosion process where bamboo is injected with steam and placed under pressure and then exposed to the atmosphere where small explosions within the bamboo due to steam release allows for the collection of fibre. Bamboo fibre can be in a pulped form in which the material is extremely fine and in a powdered state.

Ecological considerations

Growth 
Bamboo has many advantages over cotton as a raw material for textiles. They are the fastest growing woody plants in the world. One Japanese species has been recorded as growing over  a day. There are over 1,600 species found in diverse climates from cold mountains to hot tropical regions. About  of the Earth is covered with bamboo, mostly in Asia. The high growth rate of bamboo and the fact that bamboo can grow in diverse climates makes the bamboo plant a sustainable and versatile resource.

The bamboo species used for clothing is called Moso bamboo. Moso bamboo is the most important bamboo in China, where it covers about  – about two percent of China's forest area. It is the main species for bamboo timber and plays an important ecological role.

Harvesting 
Once a new shoot emerges from the ground, the new cane will reach its full height in just eight to ten weeks. Each cane reaches maturity in three to five years. It is a grass and so regenerates after being cut just like a lawn without the need for replanting. This regular harvesting actually benefits the health of the plant—studies have shown that felling of canes leads to vigorous re-growth and an increase in the amount of biomass the next year.

Yield and land use 
Bamboo can be used as food, fibre and shelter and due to its ease of growth and extraordinary growth rate it is a cheap, sustainable and efficient crop. Bamboo grows very densely, its clumping nature enables a lot of it to be grown in a comparatively small area, easing pressure on land use.

Greenhouse gases 
Because it is fast-growing, bamboo fixes more  and generates up to 35 percent more oxygen than similar stands of trees.

Deforestation 
Bamboo planting can slow deforestation, providing an alternative source of timber for the construction industry and cellulose fibre for the textile industry. It allows communities to turn away from the destruction of native forests and construct commercial bamboo plantations that can be selectively harvested annually without the destruction of the grove. Tree plantations have to be chopped down and terminated at harvest but bamboo keeps on growing.

Water use 
Bamboo uses considerable water, but there is evidence that its water-use efficiency (relative to growth) may be greater than many trees.

Soil erosion 
Yearly replanting of tillage crops increases soil erosion. The extensive root system of bamboo and the fact that it is not uprooted during harvesting means bamboo cultivation is associated with less soil erosion. The bamboo plant's root system can hold soil together along  river banks, deforested areas and in places prone to mudslides. Like forest trees, it also greatly reduces rain run-off.

Biodegradable 
Like other cellulose-based clothing materials, bamboo fibre is biodegradable in soil by micro organisms and sunlight. Having reached the end of its useful life, clothing made from bamboo can be composted and disposed of in an organic and environmentally friendly manner.

Pesticides and fertilizers 
There is no need for pesticides or fertilizers when growing bamboo, but herbicide and fertilizer applications are common in some places to encourage edible shoot growth. Bamboo also contains a substance called bamboo-kun–an antimicrobial agent that gives the plant a natural resistance to pest and fungi infestation, though some pathogen problems exist in some bamboo plantations.

References 

Textiles
Textiles